Kim Pizzingrilli is a member of the Pennsylvania Public Utility Commission and a former Secretary of the Commonwealth of Pennsylvania.

References

External links

Secretaries of the Commonwealth of Pennsylvania
Women in Pennsylvania politics
Living people
Year of birth missing (living people)
21st-century American women